Gottscheers are the German settlers of the Kočevje region (a.k.a. Gottschee) of Slovenia, formerly Gottschee County. Until the Second World War, their main language of communication was Gottscheerish, a Bavarian dialect of German.

Origins 
They first settled in Carniola around 1330 from the German lands of Tyrol and Carinthia and maintained their German identity and language during their 600 years of isolation. They cleared the vast forests of the region and established villages and towns. In 1809, they resisted the French annexation of the territory in the Gottscheer Rebellion. With the end of the Habsburg monarchy in 1918, Gottschee became a part of the new Kingdom of Yugoslavia. The Gottscheers thus went from part of the ruling ethnicity of Austria-Hungary (and the ruling group in the estates of the province of Carniola itself) to an ethnic minority in a large Slavic state. With the onset of the Second World War and the 1941 Axis invasion of Yugoslavia, their situation further worsened.

Repatriation 
Some Gottscheer community leaders embraced Nazism and agitated for "assistance" and "repatriation" to the Reich even before the German invasion in 1941, but most Gottscheers had no interest in reuniting with Greater Germany or in joining the Nazis. They had been integrated into society with their Slovene neighbors, often intermarrying and becoming bilingual while maintaining their Germanic language and customs. But propaganda and Nazi ideology prevailed, and the Main Welfare Office for Ethnic Germans (VoMi) began planning the Gottschee resettlement from the Italian-annexed territory to the Rann Triangle, the region in Lower Styria between the confluences of the Krka, Sotla, and Sava rivers, covering most of Gottschee.

To achieve their goal, accommodation had to be made for the Gottschee settlers and, beginning in November 1941, some 46,000 Slovenes from the Rann Triangle region were deported to eastern Germany for potential Germanisation or forced labor. Shortly before that, propaganda aimed at both the Gottscheers and the Slovenes promised the latter equivalent farmland in Germany for the land relinquished in Lower Styria. The Gottscheers were given Reich passports and transportation to the Rann area straight after the forced departure of the Slovenes. Most left their homes following coercion and threats as the VoMi had set 31 December 1941 as the deadline for the movement of both groups. Though many Gottscheers received houses and farmland, inevitably there was great dissatisfaction that many properties were of lesser value and quality than their original lands, and many were in disarray after the hasty expulsion of their previous occupants.

From the time of their arrival until the end of the war, Gottscheer farmers were harassed and sometimes killed by Yugoslav partisans who saw them as an instrument of the Axis powers. The attempt to resettle the Gottscheers proved a costly failure for the Nazi regime, which needed to deploy extra manpower to protect the farmers from the partisans. The deported Slovenes were taken to several camps in Saxony, Silesia, and elsewhere in Germany, where they were forced to work on German farms or in factories from 1941 to 1945. The laborers were not always kept in formal internment, but often in nearby vacant buildings. After the end of the war, most returned to Yugoslavia to find their homes destroyed.

Current residence 
The vast majority of Gottscheers and their descendants now live in the United States, mainly in New York City and Cleveland, but also in other parts of the country. Smaller numbers have settled in Canada and Austria. Gottscheer Hall in Ridgewood, Queens serves as a cultural hub and gathering place for the community.

Notable Gottscheers 
Notable Gottschee Germans or people with Gottschee German heritage include:
Albert Belay (born 1925), cultural activist
Doris Debenjak (1936–2013), linguist and translator
Johann Erker (1781–1809), Austrian rebel leader
Peter Kosler (1824–1879), lawyer and geographer
Richard J. Kramer (born 1963), American businessman
Michael J. Krische (born 1966), American chemist and professor
Roman Erich Petsche (1907–1993), educator
Ernest Pogorelc (1838–1892), photographer
Andrew Poje (born 1987), Canadian ice dancer
August Schauer (1872–1941), Roman Catholic priest and publisher

References 

 Verein Peter Kosler, Slowenien

Slovenian people of German descent